Donji Trpuci is a village in Croatia. 

Populated places in the City of Zagreb